Caelostomus latithorax is a species of ground beetle in the subfamily Pterostichinae. It was described by Straneo in 1938.

References

Caelostomus
Beetles described in 1938